Ünalan can refer to:

 Ünalan, Alaca
 Ünalan (Istanbul Metro)